Maneluk is a surname. Notable people with the surname include:

George Maneluk (born 1967), Canadian ice hockey player
Mike Maneluk (born 1973), Canadian ice hockey player